The 1962 State College of Iowa Panthers football team represented State College of Iowa (later renamed University of Northern Iowa) in the North Central Conference during the 1962 NCAA College Division football season. In its third season under head coach Stan Sheriff, the team compiled a 7–1–1 record (5–0–1 against NCC opponents) and tied for the NCC championship.  The team played its home games at O. R. Latham Stadium in Cedar Falls, Iowa.

Two players won all-conference honors: fullback Dan Boals and tackle Ted Minnick.

Schedule

References

State College of Iowa
Northern Iowa Panthers football seasons
North Central Conference football champion seasons
State College of Iowa Panthers football